Perry Lakes Basketball Stadium was a purpose-built basketball stadium located in Perth, Western Australia. The stadium was built for the Australian Basketball Senior Men's Championships held in October 1962, and was Western Australia's home of basketball until 2010.

At the time of construction, the stadium featured three courts and had no second stand facing Court 1. Courts 2 and 3 had bitumen surfaces and ran parallel to the other courts. Later Courts 4 and 5 were added, followed by the corridor along with Courts 6, 7 and 8. Court 1 at Perry Lakes was considered by many to be second only to Apollo Stadium in Adelaide as the finest in Australia.

The stadium housed the headquarters of Basketball Western Australia and Perry Lakes Basketball Association. The Perth Wildcats played their home games at Perry Lakes between 1982 and 1986, while the Perth Lynx played at Perry Lakes between 1988 and 2010.

The stadium was closed in March 2010 and later demolished to make way for housing developments. The stadium's successor was Bendat Basketball Centre, located just metres down the road.

References

Perth Wildcats
Perth Lynx
Defunct National Basketball League (Australia) venues
Defunct basketball venues in Australia
Defunct indoor arenas in Australia
1962 British Empire and Commonwealth Games venues
Boxing venues in Australia
Floreat, Western Australia